Marcus Cafagña (born December 12, 1956 in Ann Arbor, Michigan) is an American poet and professor. He is author of two poetry collections, most recently, Roman Fever (Invisible Cities Press, 2001), and has published poems published in literary journals and magazines including AGNI, Witness, and Poetry Magazine, and in anthologies.

Life
He graduated from Michigan State University with a B.A. and an M.A., and Vermont College of Fine Arts, with an MFA. He teaches at Missouri State University. His first marriage, to the poet Dianne Kitsmiller, ended with her death in 1993. He and his second wife, Jenn, have a son named Diego.

Awards
1995 National Poetry Series, for The Broken World: Poems

Published works
Full-length Collections

Anthology Publications

References

External links
 Poems: Ralph Magazine > Three Poems > "Stuck Inside of Mobile with the Memphis Blues Again"; "Gloomy Sunday"; "The Other Side"
 Poem: Rattle > July 3, 2009 > Last Meal by Marcus Cafagña
 Poem: Poetry Magazine > April 1992 > Marcus Cafagña > Dybbuks
 Interview: "Missouri Literary Festival: Marcus Cafagña interview", KSMU
 Biography: GoogleBooks: Directory of Midwestern Literature: The Authors > by Philip A. Greasley, Society for the Study of Midwestern Literature >  Marcus Cafagña > Biography, Significance, Selected Works

1956 births
Living people
American male poets
Writers from Ann Arbor, Michigan
Poets from Michigan
Poets from Missouri
Vermont College of Fine Arts alumni
Michigan State University alumni
Missouri State University faculty